Andrea Kalousová (born 18 September 1996) is a Czech model and beauty pageant titleholder who was crowned Česká Miss World 2015 and represented the Czech Republic at Miss World 2015.

Life and career
Kalousová is originally from Jaroměř and currently resides in Jablonné nad Orlicí. She studied at a nursing high school in Ústí nad Orlicí.

Kalousová was crowned as 1st Runner-up of Česká Miss 2015 and represented Jablonné nad Orlicí at the pageant on 28 March 2015. The pageant was broadcast live on TV.

In 2020 she was a contestant in Season 7 of the Czech reality TV shoe Tvoje tvář má známý hlas.

References

External links
http://www.ceskamiss.cz

1996 births
Living people
Czech beauty pageant winners
People from Jaroměř
Czech female models
Miss World 2015 delegates